Kim Shin-young (born December 20, 1983) is a South Korean comedian, MC and DJ. She debuted in 2004 on the SBS show People Looking For Laughter and won 'Best Variety Performer' at the 42nd Baeksang Arts Awards in 2006. She has hosted numerous variety shows and radio shows in South Korea and has won several awards for comedy and hosting in her career. In 2018, Kim became a member of Celeb Five (Hangul: 셀럽파이브), a dance group produced by CONTENTS LAB VIVO, a contents company owned by Song Eun-i.

Early life and education
Kim Shin-young was born in Taegu, South Korea, on December 20, 1983. She learned judo and dreamed of living in the Korea National Training Center for athletes before becoming interested in comedy. In 2002, she enrolled in the Comedy Acting Department at Yewon Arts University.

Career

2004—2008: Debut
Kim Shin-young first appeared on SBS People Looking For Laughter in 2004 and gained recognition by hosting various variety shows for years. She made her film debut as Cha Tae-hyun's sister in the 2005 film My Girl and I. In 2006, Kim won 'Best Variety Performer' at the 42nd Baeksang Arts Awards for People Looking For Laughter. In 2007, Kim became an MC of MBC's Infinite Girls, an all-female version of the show Infinite Challenge. She was a part of the show until its 3rd season which aired in 2013. The next year, Kim hosted MBC's Stop the Boring Time Radio with Super Junior's Shindong. She won the 'Radio Rookie Award' at the 2008 MBC Drama Awards.

2009—present
In 2009, Kim was paired with actor Shin Sung-rok as a virtually married couple on MBC's We Got Married. They were one of the three new couples introduced in January. Kim also became a host of KBS' Challenge Golden Ladder. She then became a regular cast member of MBC's Quiz to Change the World and became a host of KBS' Sang Sang Plus. Kim also hosted Girls' Generation's variety show Girls' Generation's Horror Movie Factory, which lasted for 6 episodes. In October, she became one of the hosts of Invincible Youth alongside Noh Joo-hyun and Kim Tae-woo. The show featured 7 girl group members (known as G7) who experienced farm life in Yuchi-ri, a village in Hongcheon-gun, Gangwon Province. On December 26, she won the 'Best Newcomer Award' at the 8th KBS Entertainment Awards. Kim started hosting the KBS idol talk-show Win Win alongside Kim Seung-woo, Choi Hwa-jung, 2PM's Wooyoung and Girls' Generation's Taeyeon in 2010. She also hosted MBC's God of Cookery Expedition and appeared in the thriller film, Midnight FM. On December 29, she won the 'Excellence Award in a Variety Show' at the 2010 MBC Entertainment Awards for Quiz to Change the World.

Kim hosted KBS' 100 Points Out of 100 in February 2011. In the same year, she joined MBC's singing competition show I Am a Singer, where she was one of seven entertainers who acted as 'managers' (i.e. mentors) for the contestants. On December 29, she won the 'Friendship Award' for Quiz to Change the World at the 2011 MBC Entertainment Awards.

In 2012, Kim returned as a host of Invincible Youth for its second season. She also became an MC for MBC's music show Show Champion with Super Junior's Shindong from February 14 to December 25, but returned as its sole host in 2015. Kim currently hosts the MBC FM4U radio show Kim Shin Young's Noon Song of Hope. On December 29, 2013, she won the 'Radio Top Excellence Award' at the 2013 MBC Entertainment Awards.

In 2020, May 1st, Kim Shin Young released her trot singer debut as 'Second Aunt KimDaVi', the single titled 'Gimme Gimme'. In 2022, she had a role in the  romantic mystery film Decision to Leave, directed by Park Chan-wook.

In December 2022, Kim terminated her contract with Media Lab Seesaw.

Variety Show

Web shows

Hosting

Radio Shows

Film

Television drama

Awards 
 2006: 42nd Baeksang Arts Awards - Best Female Variety Performer
 2008: MBC Drama Award - Radio Rookie Award
 2009: KBS Entertainment Awards - Best Newcomer
 2010: MBC Entertainment Awards - Excellence Award in a Variety Show
 2011: MBC Entertainment Awards - Friendship Award
 2013: MBC Entertainment Awards - Top Excellence Award for Radio
 2022: 43rd Blue Dragon Film Awards - Best New Actress / nom; Decision to Leave
 2022 : 2022 KBS Entertainment Awards -  Excellence Award in Show and Variety Category / won; Korea Sings

References

External links
 

South Korean television presenters
South Korean women comedians
IHQ (company) artists
1983 births
South Korean film actresses
South Korean television actresses
Living people
People from Daegu
Melon Music Award winners
Weekly Idol members
Best Variety Performer Female Paeksang Arts Award (television) winners
South Korean female judoka